The Foreign Dredge Act of 1906 is a United States federal statute that requires dredges operating in US waters to be built in the United States, and to be owned and chartered by US citizens. Dredges violating the act are subject to seizure by and forfeiture to the US government.

Origin 
The original intention of the law was to protect and foster America's shipbuilding industry to enable it to compete with established foreign shipbuilders. A dredging project to repair the town of Galveston, TX, after the 1900 Galveston hurricane raised concerns that sand exported on foreign-owned barges might be taken out of the country, effectively stealing US soil, which provided the initial motivation for the bill that would become the Foreign Dredge Act. A more central motivation emerged, which was to protect the US shipbuilding industry from foreign competition.

Current impact and criticism 
Two countries, the United States and China, prohibit foreign dredging, and 15% of countries surveyed by the Transportation Institute have restrictions on dredging. The U.S. Army Corps of Engineers and Government Accountability Office state that lack of dredging capacity and high costs are the cause of a 15-year delay in dredging the 10 most important US ports to accommodate post-Panamax depths.  The Heritage Foundation and Cato Institute claim that the Foreign Dredge Act is anti-competitive, and that it impairs America's ability to expand its ports by limiting its supply of dredging ships.  Gregory Tosi argues that, for example, the Port of Corpus Christi loses $50 billion of oil exports per year due to a lack of dredging capacity to improve the port.

90% of global dredging contracts are currently won by one of four Belgian and Dutch dredging companies Jan De Nul, Van Oord, Boskalis, and DEME, which are generally ineligible to compete for US contracts.

Proposed legislative changes 
Senator Mike Lee has proposed the DEEP Act, which would repeal the Foreign Dredge Act and create a new nationwide permitting process to expedite dredging permitting.  He has also introduced more constrained versions of the bill, the Port Modernization and Supply Chain Protection Act, that would repeal the Foreign Dredge Act's cabotage requirements, allowing international dredges to operate in the USA. 

The SHIP IT Act, introduced by Congresswoman Michelle Fischbach and Congressman Byron Donalds would allow vessels from NATO member countries to engage in dredging in the United States; the Cato Institute notes that "Four of the largest dredging companies in the world are located in NATO members, with each possessing more hopper dredges than the entire U.S. dredging fleet combined."  Lee has introduced a bill with similar purposes in the Senate, the Allied Partnership and Port Modernization Act.

References 

United States federal admiralty and maritime legislation
Dredging
1906 in American law